Queen's Award can refer to:

 Queen's Awards for Enterprise, formerly the Queen's Awards to Industry
 Queen's Award for Voluntary Service, an annual award given to groups in the voluntary sector of the United Kingdom
 Queen's Award for Forestry

See also
 The Queen's Anniversary Prizes for Higher and Further Education